Alessia Barela (born 13 June 1974) is an Italian actress.  Her credits include the television series Carlo & Malik, Tutti pazzi per amore and Inspector Rex and the films Past Perfect, Summer Games and Maximum Velocity (V-Max).

Selected filmography
Un anno in campagna (1998)
Lucignolo (1999)
Zora the Vampire (1999)
Maximum Velocity (V-Max) (2001)
Past Perfect (2002)
People of Rome (2003)
Feisbum - Il film (2009)
Eighteen: The World at My Feet (2010)
Summer Games (2011)
Fallo per papà (2012)
Il venditore di medicine (2012)
A Five Star Life (2013)
Il Natale della mamma imperfetta (2013)
Tutta colpa di Freud (2014)
Me, Myself and Her (2015)
Il ministro (2015)
Seven Days (2016)
Alice non lo sa (2017)

References

External links
 

1974 births
People from Chieti
Living people
Italian film actresses
Italian television actresses